Gregory and the Hot Air Balloon is a children's video game developed by Capitol Multimedia, published by Broderbund and released in 1996 for the Macintosh and Windows and Windows 3.x systems.

Plot
In the town of Acorn Hollow, Gregory Chuckwood and his pet lizard Newt go for a ride in a hot air balloon, but accidentally drift away to a faraway place, due to Mr. Underwood's sneezing of inadvertently releasing the balloon with the rope snapping. With the balloon downed, Gregory needs to find the scattered balloon parts to get it going again so he and Newt can return home. Various puzzles, interactive objects and characters as well as minigames are found in the game.

Voice Talents
Gregory Chuckwood - 
Newt - 
Tina -
Nina -
Zachary - 
Mr. Underwood - 
Gregory's Father - 
Gregory's Mother - 
Grandpa Chuckwood - 
Peter Porcupine - 
Tiffany Raccoon - 
 Raccoon - 
Clarence Barker - 
Rabbit - 
Rabbit - 
Mrs. Huffin - 
The Ferris Wheel Mechanic - 
Clara MacMoo - 
Barker's Robot Band - 
The Clown - 
The Porcupine Clown - 
The Elvis Presley Ghost - 
The Great Mentallo -
Birds - 
Tree - 
Ghost - 
Singing Ghost - 
Bat - 
Painter -

Reception

References

External links

1996 video games
Broderbund games
Adventure games
Classic Mac OS games
ScummVM-supported games
Video games developed in the United States
Windows games
Children's educational video games